Sugar Bear is an advertising cartoon mascot for Post Golden Crisp cereal.

Sugar Bear may also refer to:
 Kamala (wrestler) (born 1950), American professional wrestler who was born James Harris and originally wrestled as "Sugar Bear" Harris
 Ray Hamilton (born 1951), American football player who was nicknamed "Sugar Bear"
 George Scherger (1920–2011), American baseball player and coach who was nicknamed "Sugar Bear"
 Mike Thompson, father of Alana "Honey Boo Boo" Thompson, in the TLC reality show Here Comes Honey Boo Boo
 Central Arkansas Sugar Bears, the women's sports teams of the University of Central Arkansas

Lists of people by nickname